Chris Danforth is a computer scientist and a professor of applied mathematics at the University of Vermont. He is known for his work with the Hedonometer, a tool developed for measuring collective mood with sentiment analysis.

Danforth directs the Computational Story Lab at Vermont Complex Systems Center. His research job is focused on exploring human behavior through social media data.

In 2007, Danforth collaborated with Peter Sheridan Dodds to develop a tool to measure happiness that they called a "hedonometer." For creating it, a team directed by Danforth surveyed speakers of several languages to rate words on a scale of happiest to saddest. 

In collaboration with social psychologist Andrew Reece, Danforth found that depressed people post photos on Instagram whose colors are cooler and darker than those of non-depressed people. In 2020, he found evidence that analyzing social media techniques might identify viral outbreaks.

References

University of Vermont faculty
Living people
American computer scientists
Year of birth missing (living people)
University of Maryland, College Park alumni
Bates College alumni
Complex systems scientists
21st-century American mathematicians
Graph drawing people
Information visualization experts
Network scientists